The 2010–11 Northern Counties East Football League season was the 29th in the history of Northern Counties East Football League, a football competition in England.

Premier Division

The Premier Division featured 17 clubs which competed in the previous season, along with three new clubs:
Brighouse Town, promoted from Division One
Farsley, new club formed after Farsley Celtic were expelled from the Conference North in March 2010 and folded
Tadcaster Albion, promoted from Division One

League table

Division One

Division One featured 16 clubs which competed in the previous season, along with four new clubs:
Brodsworth Welfare, relegated from the Premier Division
Handsworth, promoted from the Sheffield and Hallamshire County Senior League
Louth Town, promoted from the Central Midlands League
Shirebrook Town, relegated from the Premier Division

League table

References

External links
 Northern Counties East Football League

2010-11
9